Olivier Maire S.M.M. (19 November 1960 – 9 August 2021) was a French Roman Catholic priest.

Biography
Born into a very pious family, Maire became religious from a young age. He entered the Collège de Pelousey and the Lycée Saint-Jean de Besançon, where he earned his baccalauréat. After his studies in biology, he spent his military service in Haiti. He then earned a degree in theology in Rome, being ordained a priest and joining the Company of Mary. He then trained seminarians in Uganda for many years.

A biblical critic, Maire was passionate about the Church Fathers and the Patristics, he also earned a degree in psychology. Upon his return to France, he was elected provincial superior of the Montfortaines and was installed in Saint-Laurent-sur-Sèvre.

Olivier Maire was assassinated on 9 August 2021, allegedly by Emmanuel Abayisenga, a Rwandan national who was suspected of having started the 2020 Nantes Cathedral fire and whom he had taken in. His funeral took place on 13 August 2021, in the Basilica of Saint Louis de Montfort in Saint-Laurent-sur-Sèvre, celebrated by Monsignor Éric de Moulins-Beaufort, president of the Bishops' Conference of France, Monsignor François Jacolin, Bishop of Luçon, and Reverend Luis Augusto Stefani, Superior General of the Company of Mary. Minister of Justice Éric Dupond-Moretti and Senator Bruno Retailleau also attended the ceremony.

References

August 2021 events in France
2021 murders in France
August 2021 crimes in Europe
French Roman Catholic priests
Assassinated French people
French murder victims